Sahak-e Yareyeh (also Romanized as Saḩāk-e Yareyeḩ; also known as Esḩāk-e Ḩājj Sheykh Mīrīyeh, Sahāk-e Parīḩ-e Yek, Seḩāk, and Şoḩāk) is a village in Shoaybiyeh-ye Gharbi Rural District, Shadravan District, Shushtar County, Khuzestan Province, Iran. At the 2006 census, its population was 210, in 43 families.

References 

Populated places in Shushtar County